Mikkel Agger (born 1 November 1992) is a Danish professional footballer who plays for Danish 2nd Division club Thisted FC.

Club career

Thisted
Coming through the youth ranks of Thisted FC playing in the Danish 1st Division, he signed a professional contract with the club on his birthday in 2009. Following some impressive displays for Thisted in the 2010–11 season, he went on trials with Danish Superliga clubs AaB and Esbjerg fB. Agger did not get a contract at AaB, but Esbjerg were keen on signing the striker.

Esbjerg
On 3 August 2011, Agger signed a four-year contract with Esbjerg fB. Agger made his debut only three days after joining the club. He was in the starting lineup against FC Sydvest 05 in a Danish Cup game, but had to leave the pitch after only 30 minutes due to an ankle injury.

After returning from his loan spell at FC Hjørring, Agger became the fourth choice in attack. On 27 June 2014, his contract was terminated.

In the summer transfer window of 2012, Esbjerg fB loaned Kenneth Fabricius from SønderjyskE and therefore, Agger became surplus. A half-season loan deal to FC Hjørring was announced on 13 August 2012.

Agger would be loaned out again, this time to AC Horsens on a season-long deal in September 2013.

Return to Thisted
A month after leaving Esbjerg, Agger signed a two-year deal with his former club Thisted FC. He scored 25 league goals in his first season, making him the top goalscorer of the team that season. After his successful season, Agger aroused interest from foreign clubs, notably German club FC St. Pauli. Agger, however, chose to stay at Thisted, and extended his contract by another two years in May 2016.

Viborg
On 31 January 2019, Viborg FF announced the signing of Agger from Norwegian club Sarpsborg 08 FF.

Third return to Thisted
After a season at Vendsyssel FF, Agger once again returned to Thisted FC, signing with the club on 22 June 2021.

References

External links
Danish national team profile

1992 births
Living people
Danish men's footballers
Danish expatriate men's footballers
Denmark youth international footballers
Danish Superliga players
Danish 1st Division players
Eliteserien players
Thisted FC players
Esbjerg fB players
AC Horsens players
Sarpsborg 08 FF players
Viborg FF players
Vendsyssel FF players
Association football forwards
People from Lemvig
Danish expatriate sportspeople in Norway
Expatriate footballers in Norway
Sportspeople from the Central Denmark Region